Surfing in Morocco forms a part of the country's tourism sector. 

In the 1960s, European and American expatriates began surfing in Taghazout Bay. In the decades since, a surf industry has arisen in coastal areas of Morocco such as Agadir and Essaouira. The Moroccan government invested in seaside tourism infrastructure in Taghazhout Bay surf village as part of the 2001 Azur Plan, with the aim of creating 20,000 jobs for local people. Winter is generally the high season for surf tourism in Morocco. In Moroccan culture, surfing is generally considered a masculine sport, and women surfers challenge cultural norms in taking part.

See also 

 Imsouane
 :Category:Moroccan surfers

References 

Sport in Morocco by sport
Surfing by country
Tourism in Morocco
Surfing in Morocco